Lake Forest is a railroad station in Lake Forest, Illinois, served by Metra's Milwaukee District North Line. In Metra's zone-based fare system, Lake Forest is in zone F. As of 2018, Lake Forest is the 82nd busiest of Metra's 236 non-downtown stations, with an average of 607 weekday boardings.

As of December 12, 2022, Lake Forest is served by 45 trains (21 inbound, 24 outbound) on weekdays, by all 20 trains (10 in each direction) on Saturdays, and by all 18 trains (nine in each direction) on Sundays and holidays.

Four inbound trains originate here, and four outbound trains terminate here, on weekdays. Additionally, one inbound train originates from here with one outbound train terminating here on Saturdays.

Another  station exists along the Union Pacific North Line east of this station. Therefore, this station can also be referred to as West Lake Forest station. No bus connections exist here, nor is there any connection to the East Lake Forest station. However parking is available along Telegraph Road along the west side of the tracks, and the station is accessible from North Waukegan Road through Settler's Square on the east side of the tracks.

Lake Forest is the northernmost Metra station to be located on the C&M Subdivision, and serves as an emergency stop for Amtrak's Empire Builder and Hiawatha Service trains. Since 2010, Amtrak has had plans for its Hiawatha trains to stop at Lake Forest, but as of 2022 has yet to come to fruition. Metra has proposed the construction of crossovers at Lake Forest to make the station better suited to turning trains around.

References

External links

Flickr - Lake Forest Station
Station House from Google Maps Street View

Metra stations in Illinois
Former Chicago, Milwaukee, St. Paul and Pacific Railroad stations
Lake Forest, Illinois
Railway stations in Lake County, Illinois